is a Japanese actress.

Biography
Megumi Matsushita was born in Tokyo, Japan, on January 16, 1981. Her mother is Rumi Sakakibara, a renowned actress in Japan, and her businessman father, Motoh Matsushita.  She has no siblings.
Megumi made her acting debut at 11 years old, when she appeared on a TV show with her mother.  Because of this performance, she was scouted by the Horipro, Agency.  
The next year, she made her television debut in the drama, “Kachosan no Yakudoshi" (1993) as Akemi, the daughter of the main character, played by Kenichi Hagiwara. 
In 1995, She played class leader Rumi Imaruoka in the TV drama, “Sannen B-gumi Kinpachi-sensei" from October 1995 to March 1996.

When she was 16, she played the main character, Natsumi, in the feature film, “Remembering the Cosmos Flower" (1997), which was awarded Best Feature Film by the Idyllwild International Festival of Cinema in 1997.

Also in 1997, Megumi began working in the theater.  She made her first appearance on stage as Wendy in the musical “Peter Pan.”
That same year, she would also play Rebecca Gibbs in Thorton Wilder's “Our Town." In the following years, she played the eldest daughter Liesl in the musical, “The Sound of Music” (1998), and as the main character, Midori in Ichiyō Higuchi's “Takekurabe" (1998).  The next year, she played Fredrika Armfelt in Stephen Sondheim's, “A Little Night Music.”

In other endeavors, she was the voice of “Fiorina" in the animation movie “Haha o Tazunete Sanzenri or 3000 Leagues in Search of Mother" (1998),  and played the main character, Hitomi Hayama, of "Another Mind" (1998), an adventure game created by Square for the PlayStation.
She was the hostess of the German study TV program of NHK's “Doitsugo Kaiwa" in 1999.

In 2000, She played Princess Chinatsu in the long-running historical drama, “The Unfettered Shogun.”

In 2001, she graduated from Aoyama Gakuin Women's Junior College.  She was awarded an Associate of Arts degree in English literature.

Currently, Megumi has appeared in over 70 television shows, twelve movies, and 18 plays.  Some notable performances are:

Guest TV appearances in “Mito Kōmon" (2002 and 2009),“AIBOU: Tokyo Detective Duo" (2008 and 2009),“Ouroboros" (2015), and “Kasoken no onna" (2018).

In film, She played Utsusemi in “Sakuran" (2006), The hairdresser in “Exte" (2007), Megu, the daughter of Gō Hideki/Ultraman Jack, in “Superior Ultraman 8 Brothers" (2008), and Iketani-kun's Mom in “A Boy and His Samurai" (2010).

In 2011, she played the villain, ALIEN SALOME Ligier, in “Ultraman Premiere 2011” on the stage.

She was the subject of the documentary film “Wake up in America" (2019). The film was awarded "Special Thanks Award" by the Japan Film Festival of Los Angeles.

References

External links 
  
 Toei Management artist profile 
 

1981 births
People from Shibuya
Aoyama Gakuin University alumni
Living people